Chimonocalamus is a genus of Asian bamboo in the grass family. It is native to China, the eastern Himalayas, and northern Indochina. Some of the species are aromatic and grown as ornamental plants.

Species 

Formerly included
see Chimonobambusa 
 Chimonocalamus armatus – Chimonobambusa armatus 
 Chimonocalamus callosus – Chimonobambusa callosa

References

Bambusoideae genera
Bambusoideae